Christian Devi Brando (May 11, 1958 – January 26, 2008) was an American actor who was one of the eleven children of actor Marlon Brando, and the only one Brando had with his first wife, former actress Anna Kashfi.

On May 16, 1990, Brando fatally shot Dag Drollet, the boyfriend of his half-sister Cheyenne, at his father's residence on Mulholland Drive in the Hollywood Hills. The family drama and trial were heavily publicized that year. He pleaded guilty to manslaughter and was sentenced to prison in 1991. He was released in 1996. In 2004, information introduced at the trial of Robert Blake for the 2001 murder of his wife, Bonny Lee Bakley, exposed Brando's relationship with Bakley and his possible involvement in her murder. In 2005, Brando pleaded no contest to spousal abuse of his then-wife Deborah and was given probation. He died of pneumonia on January 26, 2008, aged 49.

Early life
Christian Brando was named after his father's longtime friend French film director Christian Marquand who later directed Marlon in the film Candy (1968). Christian was born in Los Angeles on May 11, 1958, the product of an affair between Marlon Brando and Anna Kashfi, an actress born to a British family in colonial India. Marlon and Kashfi met in 1955, and Kashfi became pregnant in 1957. They married in 1958 and divorced one year later.

Christian was shuttled between his mother and father. His parents became increasingly hostile and abusive toward each other, and engaged in a protracted custody battle. The 12-year custody battle and his mother's uncontrollable temper due to her abuse of drugs and alcohol had a major effect on young Christian. Marlon eventually won custody of Christian, who was then 13 years old. At that time, Marlon had described his son as a "basket case of emotional disorder".

Marlon was a distant father and spent little time with young Christian, who was raised by nannies and servants. Christian moved between Hollywood and Tetiaroa, his father's private island near Tahiti. Marlon continued to have relationships with multiple women by whom he fathered numerous children. Years later, while commenting on his childhood, Christian said, "The family kept changing shape, I'd sit down at the breakfast table and say, 'Who are you?'"

In 1972, while his father was abroad in France filming Last Tango in Paris, Christian was kidnapped by his mother, who took him from school, then brought him to a gang of hippie friends in Baja California, Mexico. Apparently, she had promised them $10,000 if they would hide Christian away. When she refused to pay, they took and hid the boy; a posse of private detectives hired by Marlon, from an agency named "The Investigators", led by private investigator Jay J. Armes, rescued him late one night. He was found living in a tent and ill with bronchial pneumonia. His mother was arrested near the Mexican border after being pulled over for drunk driving and disorderly behavior. Back in court his father was awarded sole custody.

During his teen years, he dropped out of high school and began drinking and using LSD. He was an occasional actor but was not interested in being in the spotlight. He ran away from home to Washington state to move in with family friends, something that his father later approved and supported him in. His father would visit him there and later purchased a remote cabin for him where he practised artistic welding at the age of 22. He would divide his time between there and his father's Hollywood Hills residence.

Acting
As a child, Christian had two small roles in movies: in The Secret Life of an American Wife and I Love You, Alice B. Toklas!, both released in 1968. He appeared in four other films and four made-for-TV productions, sometimes using the alias "Gary Brown", between 1980 and 1990. He played a killer in the Sacra Corona Unita (the Quarter Italian Mafia) in the film La Posta in gioco ("The Prize at Stake"), filmed in Southern Italy in 1987.

Conflicts with the law

Manslaughter

On May 16, 1990, Brando fatally shot Dag Drollet, the boyfriend of his half-sister Cheyenne in the living room of his father's house in Beverly Hills, California. Drollet was in a four-year relationship with Cheyenne, who was 8 months pregnant by Drollet at the time.

A few days before the incident, Drollet had flown in from Tahiti to Los Angeles to visit Cheyenne. Cheyenne was visiting her father along with her mother, and both were staying at Marlon Brando's residence. Marlon Brando had known the Drollet family for years; however, Christian Brando met Dag Drollet for the first time several hours before he shot him to death.

On the evening of the killing, Brando and Cheyenne had dinner at Musso & Frank Grill, where Cheyenne told Brando that Drollet had been physically abusive toward her. Christian Brando said to a reporter from the Los Angeles Times, "She went off on this bizarre tangent."

Later, around 11 p.m. that night, Brando, who admitted to being drunk at the time, confronted Drollet at the Brando home and shot him. Brando claimed that he did not intend to kill Drollet. "I just wanted to scare him", he said. Cheyenne was staying in a separate room. Christian Brando claimed that he and Drollet were fighting over the gun when it accidentally went off. In an interview with The Times, Brando said that later revelations about Cheyenne's mental health had made him question whether she was ever beaten by Drollet. "I feel like a complete chump for believing her", he said.

Trial and aftermath
Robert Shapiro was one of Christian Brando's lawyers. Brando was initially charged with murder; however, prosecutors were unable to proceed with a murder charge because of the absence of Cheyenne, who was a crucial witness to their case. Marlon Brando had Cheyenne admitted into a psychiatric hospital in Tahiti. After several attempts to get her to return to California, a judge eventually quashed all efforts by the prosecution. Without Cheyenne's testimony, prosecutors felt they could no longer prove that Drollet's death was premeditated; therefore, Christian was not charged with first-degree murder and was presented with a plea deal. When his father pleaded for a reduced sentence for his son, he took the stand in the Santa Monica courthouse and said, "I think that perhaps I failed as a father." After heavily publicized pre-trial proceedings, Brando pleaded guilty to manslaughter and spent five years in prison.

Cheyenne attempted suicide twice during the trial. Then, in 1995, a year before Christian was released from prison, she committed suicide by hanging herself at her mother's house in Tahiti at the age of 25 after losing custody of her son.

Conditional on his release, he was accepted and enrolled in the state community college system in southern New Hampshire. After a year in the program, he moved to Washington State for a few years while working as a tree cutter and artistic welder.

Personal life

Relationship with Bonny Lee Bakley
Robert Blake and his defense attorneys claimed that Christian Brando was involved in the 2001 murder of Blake's 44-year-old wife Bonny Lee Bakley. Robert Blake was ultimately charged with his wife's murder and although acquitted in the criminal trial, he was found liable for her death in the civil case.

Testimony introduced during the criminal pre-trial hearings and the subsequent civil trial attempted to implicate Christian in the murder, suggesting that he had the same motive as Blake to have Bonny Lee Bakley killed. Bakley had become pregnant and claimed to both Brando and Blake that they were the father. A DNA test subsequently determined that Robert Blake, not Christian Brando, was the biological father.

According to trial testimony, just days before her death Bakley continued to claim Brando was the father of her child. Dianne Mattson testified in court that Brando became enraged, and at one point stated "somebody should put a bullet in that bitch's head". In a tape-recorded conversation between Brando and Bakley, Brando stated, "You're lucky. You know, I mean, not on my behalf, but you're lucky someone ain't out there to put a bullet in your head."

According to pre-trial testimony and corroboration, Christian Brando was in Washington state on the night of Bakley's death. Other pre-trial testimony alleged that associates of Brando were involved in the murder. One of those allegedly involved was the prosecution star witness: Duffy Hambleton, a stunt man. Hambleton claimed that Blake tried to hire him to kill Bakley. Hambleton claimed he refused the offer. Blake, however, testified that he hired Hambleton for personal security to protect himself and Bakley from a stalker. Criminal pre-trial and civil trial testimony claimed that Hambleton was an associate of Christian Brando and that he arranged the murder of Bakley to curry favor with Brando. The judge in the criminal case prevented the defense from presenting that view during trial.

Brando was called as a witness in Blake's civil trial but refused to testify, invoking his Fifth Amendment constitutional rights. Brando's behavior in court got him a contempt of court charge and conviction.

Marriage and spousal abuse
Brando's first marriage to make-up artist Mary McKenna ended without acrimony in 1987 after six years; they first met when both were ten years old. On October 16, 2004, in Las Vegas, after a five-year-long relationship, Brando wed Deborah Presley, an actress who had claimed to be the illegitimate daughter of Elvis Presley. The marriage lasted a short time and was annulled in June 2005 while both were residents of California. Brando pleaded no contest to charges of spousal abuse involving Deborah in January 2005. He was placed on probation and ordered to drug and alcohol rehabilitation.

In December 2005, Deborah filed a lawsuit against Brando in Los Angeles County Superior Court, alleging spousal abuse during a dispute in Brando's home. Brando counterclaimed, accusing Deborah of "a savage beating" during the same incident. He claimed that she broke into his home and beat him because he wanted to annul their marriage only 10 weeks after exchanging vows. They nonetheless stayed in contact while Christian was sent to a treatment center for his drug abuse/use. The case had not been adjudicated at the time of Christian Brando's death, and Brando's estate never settled with Deborah.

Death
Brando died of pneumonia on January 26, 2008, at Hollywood Presbyterian Medical Center at the age of 49. He had been admitted into Hollywood Presbyterian Medical Center on January 11, 2008.

Brando was buried on February 17, 2008, at the Kalama Oddfellows Cemetery in Kalama, Washington.

References

External links
 
 
  on the Skip E. Lowe Globe c.1980s

 

1958 births
2008 deaths
American male film actors
American people convicted of manslaughter
American people of British descent
American prisoners and detainees
Deaths from pneumonia in California
Male actors from Los Angeles
Manslaughter trials
Brando family
Prisoners and detainees of California
Burials in Washington (state)
20th-century American male actors